Mount Richter is a mountain rising to 2550 m between Gutenberg Glacier and upper Starshot Glacier in north Holyoake Range, Churchill Mountains, Antarctica. The mountain is 3 nautical miles (6 km) north of Mount Hubble. Named by Advisory Committee on Antarctic Names (US-ACAN) after Charles F. Richter, American physicist, California Institute of Technology, 1930–70; in collaboration with Beno Gutenberg, 1935, he developed the Richter Scale which bears his name, used to measure the magnitude of earthquakes.
 

Mountains of Oates Land